The MoonScoop Group was a French animation and production company that created and published animated television series. Its corporate headquarters were located in Paris, France, along with offices in the United Kingdom and the United States.  It was established in 2003. It is most famously known for Code Lyoko and its open-ended sequel series, Code Lyoko: Evolution.

History
One of MoonScoop's predecessors was France Animation, founded in 1984. France Animation went on to become the original producers of Les Mondes Engloutis ("Spartakus and the Sun Beneath the Sea"). In September 2003, the company was acquired from its then owner Wanadoo by Antefilms Production - an outfit created by Christophe Di Sabatino and Benoît Di Sabatino in 1990. Both companies' distribution arms were merged in March 2004 to form the present day MoonScoop.

On January 24, 2014, the Commercial Court of Paris accepted Dargaud's takeover bid of MoonScoop's library, thus becoming the owner of MoonScoop's complete catalogue and two of the company's last employees.

In 1995, GONG acquired Dramapassion, the first European drama SVOD platform, thus becoming the leader in France and Europe in the broadcasting of Korean programmes.

In 2016, for the 20th anniversary of the successful Yu-Gi-Oh! license, GONG MEDIA acquired and distributed the Yu-Gi-Oh! GX, Yu-Gi-Oh! 5D's and Yu-Gi-Oh! Zexal.

Important people
Christophe Di Sabatino and Benoît Di Sabatino (brothers) were the co-executive chairmen of the MoonScoop Group. Nicolas Atlan and Axel Dauchez were co-CEOs.

Subsidiaries
The MoonScoop Group was made up of numerous subsidiaries:

Antefilms Production - Antefilms Production is a French company that makes TV shows. It was established by Christophe Di Sabatino and Benoît Di Sabatino in 1990;
XANA Post-Production - The XANA Post-Production company is a part of MoonScoop. It does the post-production for Code Lyoko;
Taffy Entertainment - Handles worldwide Distribution, Marketing and Consumer Products Licensing for nearly all of the shows made by MoonScoop. Now it's known as Splash Entertainment.
Mike Young Productions - is the American unit of MoonScoop that produced ToddWorld and Growing Up Creepie. Now it's known as Splash Entertainment.
MoonScoop Digital Entertainment (formerly known as Queen Bee Interactive) - French developer of interactive applications and broadcast services for Television, Mobile and the Internet.
LuxAnimation - LuxAnimation is a Luxemburg unit of MoonScoop. It made Babar and the Adventures of Badou and the movie Dragon Hunters. Now it's owned by Splash Entertainment
Cyber Group Studios - is a CGI Animation studio it is private, and it produced Fish N' Chips and Mini Ninjas. Now it's owned by Splash Entertainment
Kabillion - is a video on demand network for children launched in 2007, it's available in all United States by many cable and streaming services. Now it's owned by Splash Entertainment.

Most well-known shows

Code Lyoko

Code Lyoko is a French animated series featuring both conventional animation and computer-generated imagery, produced by Antefilms during the first season and MoonScoop during the second, in association with the France 3 television network and Canal J. Code Lyoko is about a group of four boarding school students enrolled at Kadic Junior High School, named Jeremie, Odd, Ulrich, and Yumi. The students try to help a virtual girl named Aelita leave the virtual world of Lyoko (found inside a supercomputer housed in the basement of an abandoned factory near their school), and enter the real world.

A highly malevolent and rogue artificial intelligence (also referred to as a multi-agent system, and wrongly as a computer virus) named X.A.N.A., bent on world domination, has taken over the quantum supercomputer in charge of the virtual reality/world of Lyoko. If the group is able to get Aelita to the activated tower(s) out of the more than forty scattered about four of Lyoko's five tropical regions, she can neutralize Xana's violently destructive attack on the real world; then the supercomputer can reverse time to just before the attack, leaving no one except the group to remember any of the events that transpired. To complicate the situation, they must do this while ensuring that their classmates and teachers are not killed (because going back in time cannot return those killed by X.A.N.A. to life), and deal with the various personality clashes they have with them at the same time.

Code Lyoko: Evolution

This rebooted series takes place one year after the events of the original series stated above. Unlike its predecessor, however, it consists of live-action for the real world but still contains the 3D computer animation for the virtual world of Lyoko, with the Ice/Polar and Forest Sectors having been deleted.

X.A.N.A. has been mysteriously reborn with even more strength than before. This prompts Jeremie, Ulrich, Odd, Yumi, and Aelita to reactive their well-hidden quantum supercomputer in order to return to Lyoko to obliterate the menacing A.I. once again. They are joined, again, by William Dunbar as the sixth member of their fighting team, and a girl-genius named Laura Gauthier; whom they are unsure to confide in.

Traveling into the digital sea inside their submersible submarine (which they had called the Skidbladnir), the five Lyoko Warriors come across another virtual world near Lyoko called the Cortex. However, as this new virtual region is ever-changing and chaotic, Jeremie programs a secondary vehicle called the Megapod with Odd as its pilot. In the very center, lies the Core/Heart of the Cortex itself and by investigating further, they all discover a new enemy just as dangerous as X.A.N.A. Professor Lowell Tyron − who seems unaware of X.A.N.A.'s existence within his own supercomputer. The Lyoko warriors must deal with constructing a strong enough virus to completely exterminate X.A.N.A. and stop Tyron, as well as the powerful team of Ninjas he virtualizes onto the Cortex to battle the five Lyoko avatars.

Even more puzzling is the fact that Aelita's own long-lost mother, Anthea Hopper, appears to be working with their new enemy. The group is determined to discover why she is working alongside Tyron and how to reunite mother and daughter. Jeremie succeeds in developing an anti-virus to eradicate X.A.N.A. once and for all and wipe out Professor Tyron's own data in the process. Unfortunately, Tyron eventually manages to find them at Kadic Academy; due to his connection to Aelita's mother, Anthea, and legality as Aelita's stepfather. Desperate to save his work, Tyron orders that his supercomputer be shut down, which gradually causes the Cortex to disintegrate. Luckily, Odd, Ulrich, William and Aelita all managed to escape permanent virtualization in the digital sea by mere minutes. With professor Tyron's quantum supercomputer shut off, Jeremie shuts off their own supercomputer; therefore rending X.A.N.A. dormant once again; not destroying it, therefore leaving the show open-ended.

Hero: 108

A long time ago humans and animals lived together in harmony. But a wicked trickster named High Roller controlled 2 animals and tricked the other animals into thinking that humans were their enemies. Chaos reigned until a group of warriors, Lin Chung, Jumpy Ghostface, Mystique Sonia, Commander ApeTrully, Mr. No Hands, and Mighty Ray, had joined forces to end the war.

List of MoonScoop shows
As MoonScoop was the result of a merger between Antefilms and France Animation, this list consists of programming from both catalogs.
The Adventures of Marco & Gina
Air Academy
Albert le 5ème Mousquetaire (Albert the Fifth Musketeer)
Aquakids
Arsène Lupin
Au Coeur des Toiles
The Babaloos On Vacation (season 4)
The Babaloos
The Birds
Bunny Maloney
The Busy World of Richard Scarry
Care Bears: Welcome to Care-a-Lot (2012)
Casper's Scare School
C.L.Y.D.E. (co-production with CINAR)
Chloe's Closet
Chip et Charly
Code Lyoko (2003-2007)
Code Lyoko: Evolution (2013)
Cosmic Quantum Ray
The Country Mouse and the City Mouse Adventures
The Christmas Pirates
Cybergirl
Dr. Dog
En Attendant Noël
Fantastic Four: World's Greatest Heroes 
Fred des Cavernes
Funky Cops
Garage Kids (Pilot of Code Lyoko)
Geronimo Stilton 
Groove High (seasons 2–3)
The Guard
Horace and Tina
Hero: 108
Insectoscope
The DaVincibles
The Invisible Man (co-production with BRB Internacional)
It's Archie
The Jungle Book
The Legend of White Fang
Spartakus and the Sun Beneath the Sea
Lionelville
Little Vampire
Lalaloopsy
Mr. Roger
My Phone Genie
Night Hood
Nobeard The Pirate
Nothing But Monsters
Patrol 03
Pet Alien
Quick & Flupke
The Race
Rahan
Robinson Sucroe
Sherlock Yack
Strawberry Shortcake's Berry Bitty Adventures
TootuffToad Patrol (current distributor)The Twisted Whiskers ShowUrmelVampires, Pirates & AliensYoung Robin HoodWaiting For ChristmasWheel SquadWild GrindersWicked!Zevo-3 (with Skechers Entertainment)

CancelledCode Lyoko: Evolution (2013)Tara Duncan (2010–2011)The Power of Zhu (2012)The Secret of ZhuJourney to GloESabrina: Secrets of a Teenage Witch (2013–2014)Tootuff The Movie 2List of MoonScoop filmsHarryTootuff The Movie''
Quest for Zhu
Norm of the North

References

French animation studios
Television production companies of France
French companies established in 2003
Mass media companies established in 2003
Mass media companies disestablished in 2014
Mass media in Paris
2003 establishments in France
2014 disestablishments in France
French companies disestablished in 2014